Bălțați is a commune in Iași County, Western Moldavia, Romania. It is composed of seven villages: Bălțați, Cotârgaci, Filiași, Mădârjești, Podișu, Sârca and Valea Oilor.

References

Communes in Iași County
Localities in Western Moldavia